Northern snapping turtle is a common name for several turtles and may refer to:

Chelydra serpentina, native to eastern North America
Elseya dentata, native to Australia

Reptile common names
Chelydra
Elseya